Elliot D. Abravanel is an American physician and diet counselor, who developed the Body Type system for weight loss and overall wellness. Based on his experience with the "Skinny School" program in the 1970s and 1980s, the Body Type program is described in the book Dr. Abravanel's Body Type Diet and Lifetime Nutrition Plan, first published in 1983.

The Body Type program

The Body Type program asserts that there are four major glands in the human body (pituitary, thyroid, adrenal, and gonadal) and that each individual has one "dominant gland". Ann Louise Gittleman stated that Abravanel developed these ideas as an expansion of speculations by Henry G. Bieler and noted that this was done, "Without directly monitoring the behavior of any gland..." According to Abravanel, men can be P-types, T-types, or A-types, based on the dominant gland, and women can be P-types, T-types, A-types or G-types (only women can be G-types due to the purported overall influence that a woman's sexual glands can have on her body). An individual's dominant gland is claimed to influence his or her body shape, and the glandular secretions that purportedly influence personality, sleeping schedule, metabolic activity, and other characteristics. Certain foods and exercises are claimed promote or inhibit activity among one or more glands, and Abravanel asserts that people tend to feed their dominant gland first and foremost.

Through diet, exercise, and lifestyle changes, the Body Type system claims to enable an individual to move into greater balance, purportedly providing that person with greater energy reserves and a more balanced personality allegedly leading to less stress and increased overall effectiveness.

Criticism

Abravanel's Body Type system is dismissed by medical health professionals as quackery. Science writer Kurt Butler has written that Abravanel and his wife Elizabeth A. King have presented "no evidence to support their claims that specific foods stimulate specific glands and eventually exhaust them, that each individual has a 'dominant gland' at the root of any weight problem, or that herbal teas help control weight by soothing the errant gland and moderating its cravings. All this is nonsense dressed in scientific-sounding terminology."

References

20th-century American physicians
Living people
Pseudoscientific diet advocates
Year of birth missing (living people)